Craft Corner Deathmatch was a television show aired on the Style Network in 2005.

Two contestants are challenged by host Jason Jones to make things such as notebooks and handbags out of various objects. After ten minutes, the contestants show their projects to a panel of judges who then rate it on a scale from one to ten. After two rounds, the winner faces the Craft Lady of Steel for a bonus prize.

Craft Corner Death Match had a wide range of celeb judges from Betsy Johnson to Michael Kors. The show aired about 20 episodes and then due to bad ratings, was taken off the air.

External links 
Craft Corner Deathmatch home page

2000s American game shows
2005 American television series debuts